McCandlish is Scottish surname (and rarely also a given name), derived from Scottish Gaelic  (among other spellings, including  and ), meaning 'son of Cuindlis', an Old Irish name of uncertain meaning that dates to the 8th century.  Some spelling variants include McAndlish, McCanalish, McCandelich, McCandelish, McCandish, McCandlash, McCandleis, and McCandleish, among others. The name is closely related to McCandless, found in Scotland and especially Northern Ireland (as well as the Gaelic diaspora). McCandlish has also sometimes been attested in Northern Ireland.  It is etymologically but probably not familially related to west Irish , 'descendant of Cuindlis'. The earliest form of the given name can be traced back to an abbot from the 8th century called Cuindles.

Surname
 Benjamin McCandlish (1886–1975), United States Navy flag officer; 36th naval governor of Guam
 Edward Gerstell McCandlish (1887–1946), American illustrator, mapmaker, toymaker, and author of the Bunny Tots series of children's books (1920s); perhaps best known for illustrating Laboulaye's Fairy Book
 John Edward Chalmers McCandlish  (1901–1974), British Army major-general 
 John MacGregor McCandlish (1821–1901), Scottish lawyer; first president of the Faculty of Actuaries
 Mackey McCandlish, animator and co-creator of Blahbalicious
 Margherita McCandlish  Wood (1892–1954), former first lady of Guam, wife of Benjamin
 William McCandlish, British dog breeder; see List of Chairmen of the Kennel Club

Given name
 McCandlish Phillips (1927–2013), American journalist and evangelist

See also
 Candlish, a derived Scottish surname
 McCandless (surname), a more common Scots-Irish form of the name, primarily found in Northern Ireland
 Ó Cuindlis, a west Irish surname dating to the 14th century; anglicized as Conlisk, Cundlish, Quinlist, and several other variants

References

Surnames
Surnames of Scottish origin